John R. Schneider (March 31, 1937—August 27, 2002) was a Democratic State Senator in Maryland, United States.

Background
John Schneider was appointed to the position of State Senator for District 8, which covers portions of Baltimore County and Baltimore City, by former Maryland Governor Parris Glendening when Thomas L. Bromwell resigned to accept a position with the Maryland Injured Workers Insurance Fund.  However, less than two months after Schneider accepted the position, he died.  He was replaced by Joseph T. Ferraracci, who was appointed by Governor Glendening on September 17, 2002.

Education
Schneider graduated from Dundalk High School in 1956.

Career
Schneider worked as a junior draftsman at the Glenn L. Martin Company in Essex, Maryland from 1961 until 1963. He left Martin's to become a technical illustrator for Engineering Illustrated, Inc. and worked there for two years, 1961-63. After he left that company, he spent the majority of his life working for Allied Signal.  In 1995, he became a staff analyst for State Senator Thomas L. Bromwell up until Bromwell left his position in 2002.

During his short time in the Maryland State Senate, Schneider was a member of the Finance Committee.  Outside of the Senate, he was a member of the Board of Trustees for the Community College of Baltimore.

References

External links
 http://www.msa.md.gov/msa/mdmanual/05sen/former/html/msa13919.html

Maryland state senators
1937 births
2002 deaths
Politicians from Baltimore
20th-century American politicians